Ng Chin Han (born 27 November 1969) is a Singaporean actor of stage, film and television whose career has spanned more than 20 years. Usually credited as just Chin Han, he is one of the most prolific Asian actors in Hollywood.

Career 
In 1994, he gained widespread acclaim while starring in Masters of the Sea, Singapore television's first full-length English drama series to be produced in Singapore.

In 1998 Chin Han made his US film debut in Blindness, an Official Selection at the 2nd Hollywood Film Festival in a leading role opposite Vivian Wu. Soon after, he starred in the Singapore mini-series Alter Asians which won the 2001 Asian Television Award for Best TV Movie of the Year.

As a director, he has helmed acclaimed Asian premieres of plays like David Hare's The Blue Room and co-produced the official musical adaptation of Ang Lee's The Wedding Banquet.

As a producer, Chin Han has also created concerts for Tony Award winners Jason Robert Brown, Cady Huffman and Lillias White in Asia. In Los Angeles, he served as Associate Producer (credited as Chin Han Ng) on the 2006 Asian Excellence Awards that featured stars like Jackie Chan, Maggie Q, Quentin Tarantino and Danny DeVito.

Returning to the big screen, his strong supporting performance in Thom Fitzgerald's 3 Needles with Lucy Liu, Sandra Oh and Chloe Sevigny led one movie reviewer to note that for his 'small but important role, (Chin Han) delivers in SPADES' (I-S Magazine).

In 2008, Chin Han took on the pivotal role of Lau in the summer blockbuster movie The Dark Knight and was described by director Christopher Nolan as having 'a great presence... it was exactly what the character required' (South China Morning Post). The following year, Chin Han joined John Cusack, Chiwetel Ejiofor and Woody Harrelson in Roland Emmerich's epic disaster movie 2012 that has grossed more than $750 million worldwide to date.

After 2012, Chin Han worked with Oscar-nominated director Gus Van Sant on the film Restless, produced by Ron Howard and Brian Grazer, and official selection for the 64th Cannes Film Festival's Un Certain Regard Opening Gala Film. The film also stars Mia Wasikowska and Henry Hopper.

Following his history of working with award-winning directors, he next joined the star-studded ensemble in Steven Soderbergh's biohazard thriller Contagion from Warner Bros as epidemiologist Sun Feng. The film also stars Matt Damon, Kate Winslet, Marion Cottilard, Jude Law and Gwyneth Paltrow.

On US prime time television, Chin Han has guest-starred on J.J. Abrams's Fringe and has had recurring roles on ABC's Last Resort and the CW's hit show Arrow. In 2013, he completed The Sixth Gun, a pilot based on the popular graphic novel for NBC Universal and played Wu Jing in NBC's breakout show The Blacklist with James Spader. In 2014, he had a role as Councilman Yen in the Marvel Cinematic Universe movie Captain America: The Winter Soldier. Versatile as an actor, he is also one of the main players in IFC's 2015 comedy miniseries The Spoils Before Dying with Will Ferrell and Kristen Wiig.

Back in Asia, Chin Han has starred with Michelle Yeoh in Final Recipe, an intergenerational drama about celebrity chefs produced by CJ Entertainment, South Korea's largest entertainment company. Heading up an international cast for HBO Asia's groundbreaking series Serangoon Road, Chin Han's other Asian credits include China-US co-production of acclaimed Chinese short story A Different Sun and A Sweet Life from China hit producer Ning Hao.

In 2015 Chin Han received critical acclaim for his memorable role as Chancellor Jia Sidao in the Netflix series Marco Polo and followed that with a 2nd collaboration with director Roland Emmerich on the long awaited sequel to Independence Day, Independence Day: Resurgence.

Premiering March 2017, he joins Scarlett Johansson and Japanese legend Takashi 'Beat' Kitano on Rupert Sander's live-action adaptation of anime Ghost In The Shell for Paramount/Dreamworks SKG.

Chin Han's latest films are the $125 million action-disaster pic Skyscraper from Universal, alongside Dwayne Johnson and Neve Campbell, and New Line's 2021 Mortal Kombat, playing Shang Tsung.

Filmography

Films

Television

Video games

References

External links 
 
 VarietyAsiaOnline.com – Ng Chin Han makes date with "2012"

1969 births
Singaporean male film actors
Singaporean people of Chinese descent
Singaporean male stage actors
Singaporean male television actors
National University of Singapore alumni
Living people
20th-century Singaporean male actors
21st-century Singaporean male actors
Singaporean expatriates in the United States
American people of Chinese descent